Eric Ralph Rasmussen (born March 22, 1952) is a former professional baseball pitcher, and current coach in the Minnesota Twins organization.

Career

Early years
Born Harold Ralph Rasmussen, he was originally known as Harry until legally changing his name to Eric during the – offseason. The right hander was originally selected by the Boston Red Sox in the fourth round of the January 1971 Major League Baseball draft, but opted instead to attend the University of New Orleans, where he was named first team All-America. The St. Louis Cardinals then selected him in the 32nd round of the 1973 Major League Baseball draft. He was the last player selected and signed in his draft year to play in the Major Leagues.

St. Louis Cardinals
He was called up to the majors that July, and hurled a seven hit shutout (7 strikeouts, 1 walk) of the San Diego Padres in his major league debut. He also collected his first major league hit and drove in the second run of the game with a fifth inning single. He wound up starting 13 games for the Cardinals over the rest of the season, going 5-5 with a 3.78 earned run average.

After splitting 1976 between the bullpen and starting rotation, Rasmussen had perhaps his best season statistically in 1977. He set career bests in ERA (3.48), strikeouts (120), innings pitched (233) and complete games (11). Despite his good numbers, Rasmussen lost 17 games against 11 wins for the third-place Cards.

San Diego Padres

Rasmussen started  with St. Louis, but was traded to the San Diego Padres in May for outfielder George Hendrick. Although most of his other numbers fell off, he set his career high with fourteen wins between the two clubs. That wasn't enough to keep Rasmussen in the Padres' starting rotation, though, as he spent the next two seasons bouncing back and forth between starting and relieving. Following the  season, Rasmussen was released by the Padres.

Mexican League, and back to St. Louis
He returned to the Cardinals, who were in the midst of a playoff drive, that September. He pitched in eight games, going 1-2 with a 4.42 ERA. His one win came on the final day of the season against the Chicago Cubs, as the Cards won the National League East by three games over the Philadelphia Phillies. Rasmussen was not part of the World Series champions' post season roster.

Rasmussen opened the  season with the Cardinals, but he was used sparingly. After a pair of poor outings in May, Rasmussen was sent to the minors. He started four games for the Triple-A Louisville Redbirds, going 2–2 with an ERA of 4.13, before being sold to the Kansas City Royals.

Kansas City Royals
The Royals released Vida Blue to make room in their starting rotation for Rasmussen. He rewarded their confidence by hurling a shutout against the Boston Red Sox. It was the first shutout by a Royals pitcher since October 1981, and his first major league shutout since . It also earned him the distinction of being the only major league pitcher ever to hurl a shutout in both his National League and American League debuts. He appeared in 11 games in all for the Royals in 1983, including 9 starts, winning 3 games and losing 6 before a groin pull ended his season. At the end of the season, he was released.

Back in the minors
Rasmussen spent the next several seasons attempting to return to the major leagues. He spent  with the Houston Astros organization, pitching for the Tucson Toros. He was picked up by the Baltimore Orioles partway through 1986, and he spent the next season and a half with their top farm club, the Rochester Red Wings.

Career statistics

Rasmussen described his best pitch as a fastball. He threw a four-seam, a two-seam and a cut fastball.

Though never much of a hitter, he collected the game-winning RBI of his August 5 start during his rookie season. He had ten career RBIs. His only career two RBI game came against reigning Cy Young Award winner Randy Jones in 1977.

He went on to pitch for the Fort Myers Sun Sox for the duration of the two-year run of the Senior Professional Baseball Association in –.

Coaching

Rasmussen accepted a pitching coach position in the Cleveland Indians' minor league system in 1988. In , he jumped over to the Minnesota Twins' organization, where he has remained ever since. Following the  season, Rasmussen was promoted to Twins Minor League Pitching Coordinator, which is the position he currently holds.

The entire 2008 starting rotation for the Twins all pitched for Rasmussen in Fort Myers. Some of the other notable names to have been coached by Rasmussen include Johan Santana, Matt Garza, LaTroy Hawkins and Mark Redman. Following Paul Molitor's hiring as Twins manager, he interviewed for the major league pitching coach job that ultimately went to Neil Allen.

Personal life
Eric has been married to Linda Rasmussen since 1982.

Rasmussen was taught guitar by fellow San Diego Padres pitcher John D'Acquisto. They formed a band called Wild Pitch following the 1979 season, and played in local San Diego clubs.

Rasmussen was central in helping Sam Kuhnert form the NubAbility Athletic Foundation. NubAbility is a sports clinic for children who have lost a limb. Kuhert was born without a left hand.

References

External links

1952 births
Living people
American expatriate baseball players in Mexico
Arkansas Travelers players
Baseball coaches from Wisconsin
Baseball players from Wisconsin
Cardenales de Lara players
American expatriate baseball players in Venezuela
Fort Myers Sun Sox players
Gulf Coast Cardinals players
Kansas City Royals players
Leones de Yucatán players
Louisville Redbirds players
Major League Baseball pitchers
Mexican League baseball pitchers
Miami Marlins (FSL) players
Minnesota Twins coaches
New Orleans Privateers baseball players
Rochester Red Wings players
San Diego Padres players
Sportspeople from Racine, Wisconsin
Sportspeople from the Milwaukee metropolitan area
St. Louis Cardinals players
St. Petersburg Cardinals players
Tucson Toros players
Tulsa Oilers (baseball) players